Buda is an unincorporated community in Buffalo County, Nebraska, United States. It is part of the Kearney, Nebraska Micropolitan Statistical Area.

Geography
It is located four miles east of Kearney and eight miles west of Gibbon.

History
Buda was founded in 1886 when the railroad was extended to that point. It was likely named after Buda, now a part of Budapest, in  Hungary.

References

Unincorporated communities in Nebraska
Unincorporated communities in Buffalo County, Nebraska
Kearney Micropolitan Statistical Area